Jane S. Gerber (born 1938) is a professor of Jewish history and director of the Institute for Sephardic Studies at the City University of New York.

Life and education

Gerber, née Jane Satlow was born in 1938 to Israeli mother Elise Kliegman and father David Satlow. Growing up in an observant family, she and her two sisters attended The Center Academy at the Brooklyn Jewish Center. In 1955, she finished high school and enrolled at Wellesley College studying the works of French novelist, Marcel Proust.

After receiving her undergraduate education, she continued on at Harvard University where she began to study the relationship between Jewish and Islamic history. She met her future husband, Roger A. Gerber,at Harvard. She and Gerber moved to New York and married in 1965. In New York, Gerber continued her work on Jewish-Islamic History at Columbia University and earned her Ph.D. on the interactions between the local population of Fez, Morocco, and the recently immigrated Megorashim.

Gerber has three daughters.

Academic career
Gerber teaches classes in Classics, History, and Masters level Liberal Studies in the Center for Jewish Studies at the City University of New York, specializing in Sephardic history. She is director of the Institute for Sephardic Studies.

Gerber's books include Jews of Spain: A History of the Sephardic Experience and Jewish Society in Fez. Gerber served as president of the Association for Jewish Studies from 1981-1983.

Works
 
 
 
(1997) Jewish Society in Fez, 1450-1700: Studies in Communal and Economic Life (Studies in Judaism in Modern Times) 

Her one-volume history of Sephardic Jews of Spain was described as "excellent" and a reviewer noted her strengths in synthesizing much recent research about this people.

Awards 

 1993: National Jewish Book Award in the Sephardic Studies category for Jews of Spain: A History of the Sephardic Experience

References

External links
The Institute for Sephardic Studies at The City University of New York

1938 births
Living people
Scholars of antisemitism
Jewish scholars
20th-century American Jews
21st-century American historians
American women historians
21st-century American women writers
Harvard University alumni
City College of New York alumni
Wellesley College alumni
21st-century American Jews
20th-century American women